1993 Emperor's Cup Final was the 73rd final of the Emperor's Cup competition. The final was played at National Stadium in Tokyo on January 1, 1994. Yokohama Flügels won the championship.

Overview
Yokohama Flügels won their 1st title, by defeating Kashima Antlers 6–2  with Edu, Ippei Watanabe, Amarilla and Yasuharu Sorimachi goal.

Match details

See also
1993 Emperor's Cup

References

Emperor's Cup
1993 in Japanese football
Yokohama Flügels matches
Kashima Antlers matches